Quintus Petronius Didius Severus was a Roman who lived in the 2nd century. Severus' family was one of the most prominent and significant families in Midolanensis or Mediolanum (modern Milan, Italy).

Severus was of the gens Petronia. His father was Quintus Petronius Severus, born c. 70 AD, was a distinguished General and had a sister named Petronia Vara, born c. 75 AD. His mother was Didia Jucunda, of the gens Didia, thus explaining the use of both gentile names in his own, as became the custom around this time. His paternal grandfather Quintus Petronius, son of one Gaius Petronius, was an Insuber or Insubrian in the city. His grandfather, father, aunt and Severus himself were born and raised in Mediolanensis.

Severus married Aemilia Clara, an African woman from Hadrumetum. Their sons were:
 Didius Proculus, married, his son was betrothed to his niece Didia Clara.
 Didius Nummius Albinus
 Marcus Didius Severus Julianus, 137 AD, best known as Didius Julianus, briefly Roman Emperor in 193 AD.

References

 Augustan History - Didius Julianus

External links
 https://web.archive.org/web/20070205062029/http://www.roman-empire.net/decline/julianus.html
 https://web.archive.org/web/20060511154451/http://www.ancientlibrary.com/smith-bio/1761.html

Nobility from Milan
Roman-era inhabitants of Italy
2nd-century Romans
Severus, Quintus Petronius
Didius Severus, Quintus